Beiersdorf is a German company.

Beiersdorf may also refer to:

 Beiersdorf (Coburg)
 Beiersdorf, Saxony, municipality
 Beiersdorf-Freudenberg, municipality
 Paul Beiersdorf (1836–1896), pharmacist
 Russell Beiersdorf (born 1965), professional golfer